This article lists various statistics related to Santa Tecla Futbol Club.

All stats accurate as of 21 October 2021.

Honours
As of 21 January 2023, Santa Tecla have won 4 Salvadoran Primera División and 1 Segunda Division trophies.

Domestic competitions

League
Salvadoran Primera División
Champions  (4): Clausura 2015, Apertura 2016, Clausura 2017, Apertura 2018

Segunda Division
Champions (1): Clausura 2012

Cup
 Copa El Salvador and predecessors 
 Champions (2) : 2016–17, 2018–19

CONCACAF competitions

Official titles
CONCACAF Champions League
Winners (1): TBD

Individual awards

Award winners
Top Goalscorer (-)
The following players have won the Goalscorer while playing for Santa Tecla:
 TBD (-)  – Clausura 2004

Goalscorers 
Most goals scored : 80 - Ricardo Ferreira
Most League goals: 80 -  Ricardo Ferreira
Most League goals in a season: 10 - Ricardo Ferreira, Primera Division, Clausura 2014
Most goals scored by a Santa Tecla player in a match: 3 - Ricardo Ferreira v. Juventud Independiente (Santa Tecla 3-1 Juventud Independiente),  January 2015 and William Maldonado v. UES (Santa Tecla 5-0 UES), 2016
Most goals scored by a Santa Tecla player in an International match: 1 - Ricardo Ferreira v. C.S.D. Municipal, 25 August 2015, Irvin Herrera v. Real Salt Lake 24 September 2015 
Most goals scored in CONCACAF competition: 2 - Gerson Mayen, 2018 CONCACAF Champions League

All-time top goalscorers 

<small>Note: Players in bold text are still active with Santa Tecla F.C.</small>

Historical goals

 Players 

AppearancesCompetitive, professional matches only including substitution, number of appearances as a substitute appears in brackets.Last updated 4 February 2021 

Other appearances records
 Youngest first-team player:  –  Henry Quinteros v C.D. Audaz, Primera Division, 22 March 2018
 Oldest first-team player:  –  Sebastián Abreu v UES, Primera Division, 6 August 2016
 Most appearances in Primera Division: 207 games –  Ricardo Ferreira
 Most appearances in International competitions: TBD –  TBD
 Most appearances in CONCACAF competitions: TBD –  TBD
 Most appearances in UNCAF competitions: TBD  –  TBD
 Most appearances in CONCACAF Champions League: TBD –  TBD
 Most appearances in UNCAF Copa: TBD  TBD
 Most appearances as a foreign player in all competitions: 207 games –  Ricardo Ferreira
 Most appearances as a foreign player in Primera Division: 185 games –  Ricardo Ferreira
 Most consecutive League appearances: TBD –  TBD – from Month Day, Year at Month Day, Year
 Shortest appearance: –

Records

Scorelines
Record League victory: 8-0 v  C.D. Pasaquina, Primera division, 14 February 2016
Record League Defeat: 1-7 v  Alianza F.C., Primera division, 22 July 2012
Record Cup victory: 6–1 v Escuela de Fútbol de Guazapa, 2017 Copa El Salvador, 22 March 2017	
Record Cup loss: 3-5 v Escuela de Fútbol de Guazapa, 2017 Copa El Salvador, 19 October 2016
Record CONCACAF Champions League Victory: 2-1  v Seattle Sounders FC, February 22, 2018
Record CONCACAF Champions League defeat: 0-4 v Seattle Sounders FC,  March, 2018
Record CONCACAF League Victory: 2-1 v Herediano, 8 August 2018
Record CONCACAF League defeat: 1-0 v Herediano, 2 August 2018

Sequences
Most wins in a row: TBD, TBD - TBD
Most home wins in a row (all competitions): 49 games, April 2017 – 17 February 2019
Most home league wins in a row: 45 games, April 2017  - 17 February 2019
Most away wins in a row: TBD, TBD – TBD
Most draws in a row: TBD, TBD
Most home draws in a row: TBD, TBD
Most away draws in a row: TBD, TBD
Most defeats in a row: 8, TBD
Most home defeats in a row: TBD, TBD
Most away defeats in a row: TBD, TBD
Longest unbeaten run: 18, 2003 Season
Longest unbeaten run at home: TBD, TBD
Longest unbeaten run away: TBD, TBD
Longest winless run: TBD,  TBD – TBD
Longest winless run at home: TBD, TBD – TBD
Longest winless run away: TBD, TBD - TBD

Seasonal
Most goals in all competitions in a season: 45 goals - Clausura 2016
Most League goals in a season (Apertura/Clausura): 45 goals - Clausura 2016
Fewest league goals conceded in a season (Apertura/Clausura): 14 goals - Clausura 2016
Most points in a season (Apertura/Clausura): 45 points - Clausura 2016
Most League wins in a season (Apertura/Clausura): 12 games – Clausura 2016
Fewest wins in a season(Apertura/Clausura): 4 games – Apertura 2013
Most League losses in a season (Apertura/Clausura): 7 Games – Apertura 2012, Apertura 2013, Clausura 2014
Fewest losses in a season(Apertura/Clausura): 1 game - Clausura 2016	
Most home League wins in a season: 7 games – Clausura 2016
Most away League wins in a season: 4 games – Clausura 2016

Internationals
Most international caps (total while at club): 19 - Gerson Mayen - El Salvador

Attendances
Highest home attendance: v Isidro Metapan,4,276 people, December 14, 2014
Highest away attendance: TBD v TBD, TBD, TBD, TBD
Highest game attendance in the domestic season: v Isidro Metapan, 6, 152 people, May 24, 2015
 Highest game attendance post season: v Alianza F.C., 29,392 people, December 20, 2016 
Lowest home attendance: v Pasaquina, 114 people, November 25, 2017
Lowest away attendance: TBD v TBD, TBD, TBD, TBD
Highest game attendance in International Competition: 
Highest home attendance in International Competition:  v Seattle Sounders FC, 7,000 people, February, 2018.
Lowest home attendance in International Competition:  v
Highest away attendance in International Competition: v Seattle Sounders FC, 35,549 people, March 1, 2018
Lowest away attendance in International Competition: v

Other
 TBD
 TBD
 TBD

International level
 As of 3 August 2018 Friendly matches not included. Games decided by penalty shootout are counted as ties.InternationalsThe following players represented their countries while playing for Santa Tecla (the figure in brackets is the number of caps gained while a Santa Tecla player. The asterisk on the end means they earned their caps while at Santa Tecla.  Many of these players also gained caps while at other clubs. Figures for active players (in bold) last updated 2016''
  

El Salvador
 Gerson Mayen (9) *
 William Maldonado  (1)*
 Ricardo Ulloa 
 Óscar Navarro 
 Edwin Sánchez 
 Derby Carrillo (11) *
 Francisco Medrano
 Kevin Santamaría (4)
 Ivan Mancia (3) *
 Irving Herrera (2) *
 Juan Barahona (8) *
 Roberto Domínguez (4) *
 Marlón Cornejo (1) *
 Diego Chavarria (1)
 Alexander Mendoza *
 Gilberto Baires*
 Jairo Henríquez*
 Bryan Tamacas *
 Roberto Dominguez*
 Wilma Torres*

Panama
 Armando Polo

Uruguay
 Sebastián Abreu
 Carlos Bueno

References

External links

Football in El Salvador